The U.S. House Subcommittee on Africa is a subcommittee within the House Foreign Affairs Committee. It was known in previous Congresses as the Subcommittee on Africa, Global Health, Global Human Rights and International Organizations; those matters now have their own subcommittee.

Jurisdiction
The subcommittee is one of five with what the committees calls "regional jurisdiction" over a specific area of the globe. Such jurisdiction includes political relations between the United States and countries in the region and related legislation, disaster assistance, boundary issues, and international claims. The regional subcommittees also oversee the activities of the United Nations and its programs in the region.

The subcommittee is also the only regional subcommittee to also exercise what the committee calls "functional jurisdiction," including oversight of international health issues, population issues, legislation and oversight pertaining to implementation of the Universal Declaration of Human Rights, and other matters relating to internationally recognized human rights, including legislation aimed at the promotion of human rights and democracy generally.

Members, 117th Congress

Historical membership rosters

115th Congress

116th Congress

References

External links
 Subcommittee page

Foreign Affairs Africa, Global Health, and Human Rights